Shut Your Mouth is the fifth studio album by Australian punk rock band Frenzal Rhomb, released on 20 November 2000. Originally scheduled to be released on 6 November, it was the first and last Frenzal Rhomb album to be issued in Australia on the Epic label which dropped the band less than six months later. It was released by Fat Wreck Chords around the world and re-issued by Epitaph/Shock Records in the band's native Australia with the U.S. track listing.

Frenzal Rhomb have said many times that they will not play songs from Shut Your Mouth during shows, leading to some fans speculating that Lindsay sold the rights to play the songs live for a half eaten salad pita and a warm glass of sav blanc.

Track listing

Original Epic/Sony Records Australian version

This version of the album came in a stickered sleeve and with a multimedia component with a 'My City Of Sydney' film clip (not available anywhere else) and an interview with the band members. There is a hidden song on Track 0, "Baby Won't You Hold Me In Your Arm". A longer version of this song later appeared on the For the Term of Their Unnatural Lives compilation record.

The version of "Everything's Fucked" on this release has the term "racist cunt" censored and replaced with animal noises.

US and re-released Australian version

Charts

References

2000 albums
Frenzal Rhomb albums
Epic Records albums
Epitaph Records albums
Fat Wreck Chords albums